Glenrowan is a town located in the Wangaratta local government area of Victoria, Australia. It is 236 kilometres north-east of Melbourne and 14 kilometres from Wangaratta and near the Warby Ranges and Mount Glenrowan.

History 
Glenrowan was named after farmers James and George Rowan who ran farms in the area between 1846 and 1858. The township was settled in the late 1860s, the Post Office opening on 22 February 1870. It is famous for the bushranger Ned Kelly, who made his last stand and was eventually captured there in 1880 after a siege and shootout with police. The local railway station opened in 1874 and closed to passengers in 1981.

The town gives its name to the Glenrowan wine region which was formally defined in 2003, with the first grape vines planted in 1866.

The town today 

Glenrowan is a popular rest point for those travelling on the Hume Freeway. In the township of Glenrowan, off the highway, tourists can rest, walk and examine the famous Kelly siege sites.

The town had an Australian rules football team competing in the Ovens & King Football League however went in to recess after the 2019 season due to lack of support.

Climate

Works on the area and Ned Kelly

Books
Though a very small locality many books on the Kelly Gang's final siege at Glenrowan exist. Though many works discuss land selection, social conflict etc., they all have many details, photos, maps, sketches and facts about 1880 Glenrowan, its railway, the two hotels, and planned train derailment.

 Kenneally, J. J. The Inner History of the Kelly Gang, 1929 (many reprints available- this was a watershed pro-Kelly work) shows pictures of Glenrowan during the 1880s
 Brown, Max. Australian Son, Georgian House, Melbourne, 1948 (plus subsequent reprints) shows pictures of Glenrowan in the 1940s
 Carey, Peter, True History of the Kelly Gang, Vintage, 2001 (this is fiction; not a history)
 Cave, Colin (ed.) Ned Kelly Man and Myth, Cassel North Melbourne, 1963. (an important watershed work in lifting the Kelly story into the academic arena)
 Jones, Ian. Ned Kelly: A Short Life, Lothian, Port Melbourne, 1995.  (a comprehensive work including sketches of Glenrowan and the Kelly siege)
 Prior,Tom.  et al., A Pictorial History of Bushrangers, Paul Hamlyn, Sydney, 1968. (many photos of Glenrowan in 1880 taken during and after the Kelly siege at the hotel)
 Molitorisz, Sacha. The Romance of Robbery: Australian Bushrangers, Murray David, French Forest, 1998,  (photos and contemporary drawings of Ned Kelly at Glenrowan)
 McQuilton, John. The Kelly Outbreak 1878-1880, Melbourne University Press, 1979. (a watershed academic work which discusses land selection in the vicinity of Glenrowan)
 Phillips, John, The Trial of Ned Kelly, The Law Book Company, North Ryde, 1987.
 Clune, Frank. The Kelly Hunters, 1954.
 Osborne, Charles. Ned Kelly, Sphere Books, London, 1970.
 Sadlier, John, Recollections of a Victorian Police Officer, (1913)Penguin Colonial Facsimiles Ringwood, 1973. (autobiography from a Kelly Gang police pursuer and conflicts in the Glenrowan locale)

Plays
Douglas Stewart, Ned Kelly, 1943. (play for radio broadcasts)

TV movies

The Last Outlaw (1980) (a TV mini-series)

Fictional novels set around Glenrowan

"O'Brien, Antony. Bye-Bye Dolly Gray, Artillery Publishing, Hartwell, 2006."

References

External links

Glenrowan Football / Netball Club website
History of Glenrowan  
History of the siege of Glenrowan 
 Australian National Heritage listing for the Glenrowan Heritage Precinct
  Google Street View- Ned Kelly animated theatre

Towns in Victoria (Australia)
Rural City of Wangaratta
Populated places established in the 1860s
Hume Highway